This is a list of territorial governors in the 17th century (1601–1700) AD, such as the administrators of colonies, protectorates, or other dependencies. Where applicable, native rulers are also listed.

A dependent territory is normally a territory that does not possess full political independence or sovereignty as a sovereign state yet remains politically outside of the controlling state's integral area. The administrators of uninhabited territories are excluded.

Denmark
Danish West India Company, Denmark–Norway Danish colonial empire
Monarchs

Danish West Indies
Governors of St. Thomas
Erik Nielson Smit, Governor (1665–1666)
Kjeld Jensen Slagelse, Governor (c.1666)
Jørgen Iversen Dyppel, Governor (1672–1680)
Nicolai Esmit, Governor (1680–1682)
Adolph Esmit, Governor (1682–1684)
Governors of St. Thomas and St. John
Gabriel Milan, Governor (1684–1686)
Mikkel Mikkelsen, Interim Governor (1686)
Christopher Heins, Governor (1686–1687)
Adolph Esmit, Interim Governor (1687–1688)
Christopher Heins, Governor (1688–1689)
Johan Lorensen, Governor (1689–1692)
Frans de la Vigne, Governor (1692–1693)
Johan Lorensen, Governor (1693–1702)

England
Kingdom of England English overseas possessions
Monarchs

British Isles

Guernsey, Crown dependency
British monarchs are the Dukes of Normandy
Governors
Thomas Leighton, Governor (1570–1609)
George Carew, Governor (1610–1621)
Henry Danvers, Governor (1621–1644)
Robert Rich, Governor (1643–1644)
Peter Osborne, Governor (1644–1649)
Henry Percy, Governor (1649–1650)
Alban Coxe, Governor (1649–1650)
John Bingham, Governor (1651–1660)
Henry Wanseye, Governor (1660)
Hugh Pollard, Governor (1660–1662)
Christopher Hatton, 1st Baron Hatton, Governor (1662–1665)
Jonathan Atkins, Governor (1665–1670)
Christopher Hatton, 1st Viscount Hatton, Governor (1670–1706)
Colonel Mordaunt, Governor (1697)
Bailiffs
Amice de Carteret, Bailiff (1601–1631)
Jean de Quetteville, Bailiff (1631–1643)
Pierre de Beauvoir, Bailiff (1644–1651, 1652–1653, 1656–1660)
Amias Andros, Bailiff (1661–1674)
Edmund Andros, Bailiff (1674–1713)

Kingdom of Ireland, effectively a client state of England/Scotland
English monarchs are the Monarchs of Ireland
Lord Lieutenant of Ireland
 The Lord Mountjoy (Lord Deputy): 21 January 1600
 The Lord Mountjoy (Lord Lieutenant): 25 April 1603
 Sir Arthur Chichester: 15 October 1604
 Sir Oliver St John: 2 July 1616
 Henry Cary, 1st Viscount Falkland: 18 September 1622
 Lords Justices: 8 August 1629
 The Viscount Wentworth later The Earl of Strafford: 3 July 1633 (executed May 1641)
 The Earl of Leicester (Lord Lieutenant): 14 June 1641
 The Marquess of Ormonde: 13 November 1643 (appointed by the king)
 Viscount Lisle: 9 April 1646 (appointed by parliament, commission expired 15 April 1647)
 The Marquess of Ormonde: 30 September 1648 (appointed by the King)
 Oliver Cromwell (Lord Lieutenant): 22 June 1649
 Henry Ireton (Lord Deputy): 2 July 1650 (d. 20 November 1651)
 Charles Fleetwood (Lord Deputy): 9 July 1652
 Henry Cromwell (Lord Deputy): 17 November 1657
 Henry Cromwell (Lord Lieutenant): 6 October 1658, resigned 15 June 1659
 Edmund Ludlow (Commander-in-Chief): 4 July 1659
 The Duke of Albemarle: June 1660
 The Duke of Ormonde: 21 February 1662
 The Earl of Ossory (Lord Deputy): 7 February 1668
 The Lord Robartes: 3 May 1669
 The Lord Berkeley of Stratton: 4 February 1670
 The Earl of Essex: 21 May 1672
 The Duke of Ormonde: 24 May 1677
 The Earl of Arran: 13 April 1682
 The Duke of Ormonde: 19 August 1684
 Lords Justices: 24 February 1685
 The Earl of Clarendon: 1 October 1685
 The Earl of Tyrconnell (Lord Deputy): 8 January 1687
 King James II himself in Ireland: 12 March 1689 – 4 July 1690
 King William III himself in Ireland: 14 June 1690 
 Lords Justices: 5 September 1690
 The Viscount Sydney: 18 March 1692
 Lords Justices: 13 June 1693
 The Lord Capell (Lord Deputy): 9 May 1695
 Lords Justices: 16 May 1696

Caribbean

Colony of the Bahamas
Governors
William Sayle, Governor of Eleuthera (1648–1657)
Hugh Wentworth, Governor (1671)
John Wentworth, Governor (1671–1676)
Charles Chillingworth, Governor (1676–1677)
Roger Clarke, Governor (1680–1682)
Richard Lilburne, Governor (1684)
Thomas Bridges, Governor (1686–1690)
Cadwallader Jones, Governor (1690–1693)
Nicholas Trott, Governor (1694–1696)
Nicholas Webb, Governor (1697–1699)
Read Elding, Acting Governor (1699–1700)
Elias Haskett, Governor (1700–1701)

Colony of Barbados
Governors
Henry Powell, Governor (1627–1628)
William Deane, Governor (1628)
Charles Wolferston, Governor (1628–1629)
John Powell, Governor (1629)
Robert Wheatley, Governor Acting (1629)
William Tufton, Governor (1629–1630)
Henry Hawley, Governor (1630–1640)
Richard Peers, Acting Governor (1633–1634)
William Hawley, Acting Governor (1638–1639)
Henry Huncks, Governor (1640–1641)
Philip Bell, Governor (1641–1650)
Francis Willoughby, Governor (1650–1651), Governor in dissidence (1651–1652)
George Ayscue, Governor (1651–1652)
Daniel Searle, Acting Governor (1652–1660)
Thomas Modyford, Acting Governor (1660–1660)
Humphrey Walrond, Acting Governor (1660–1663)
Francis Willoughby, Governor (1663–1666)
Henry Willoughby, Acting for  Willoughby (1664), Acting Governor (1666–1667)
William Willoughby, Acting Governor (1667)
Samuel Barwick, Acting Governor (1667)
Henry Hawley, Acting Governor (1667)
William Willoughby, Governor (1667–1673)
Christopher Codrington, Acting for  Willoughby (1668–1669)
Peter Colleton, Acting Governor (1673–1674)
Jonathan Atkins, Governor (1674–1679)
John Witham, Acting Governor (1680–1683)
Richard Dutton, Governor (1683–1685)
Edwyn Stede, Acting Governor (1685–1690)
James Kendall, Governor (1690–1694)
Francis Russell, Governor (1694–1696)
Francis Bond, Acting Governor (1696–1697)
Ralph Grey, Governor (1697–1701)

Colony of Jamaica
Commanders, Governors
William Penn, Commander (1655)
Robert Venables, Commander (1655)
Edward D'Oyley, Commander (1655–1656)
William Brayne, Commander (1656–1657)
Edward D'Oyley, Commander (1657–1661), Governor (1661–1662)
Thomas Hickman-Windsor, Governor (1662)
Charles Lyttelton, Acting Deputy governor (1662–1663)
Thomas Lynch, Acting Deputy governor (1663–1664)
Edward Morgan, Deputy governor (1664)
Thomas Modyford, Deputy governor (1664–1671)
Thomas Lynch, Lieutenant governor (1671–1674)
Henry Morgan, Acting Lieutenant governor (1674–1675)
John Vaughan, Lieutenant governor (1675–1678)
Henry Morgan, Acting Lieutenant governor (1678)
Charles Howard, Lieutenant governor (1678–1680)
Henry Morgan, Acting Lieutenant governor (1680–1682)
Thomas Lynch, Lieutenant governor (1682–1684)
Hender Molesworth, Acting Lieutenant governor (1684–1687)
Christopher Monck Christopher Monck, Lieutenant governor (1687–1688)
Hender Molesworth, Acting Lieutenant governor (1688–1689)
Francis Watson, Acting Lieutenant governor (1689–1690)
William O'Brien,<ref>William James Gardner, The History of Jamaica : From its Discovery by Christopher Columbus to the Year 1872, p. 72</ref> Governor (1690–1692)
John White, Acting Governor (1691–1692)
John Bourden, Acting Governor (1692–1693)
William Beeston, Acting Governor (1693–1699), Governor (1699–1702)

Mediterranean

English Tangier
Governors
Henry Mordaunt, Governor (1662–1663)
Andrew Rutherford, Governor (1663–1664)
Tobias Bridge, Acting Governor (1664)
John Fitzgerald, Governor (1664–1665)
John, Governor (1665–1666)
Henry Norwood, Governor (1666–1669)
John Middleton, Governor (1669–1670)
Hugh Chomondeley, Acting Governor (1670–1672)
John Middleton, Governor (1672–1674)
unspecified Acting Governor (1674–1675)
William O'Brien, Governor (1675–1680)
Palmes Fairbourne, Governor (1680)
Thomas Butler, Governor (1680)
Charles FitzCharles, 1st Earl of Plymouth, Governor (1680)
Edward Sackville, Governor (1680–1681)
Percy Kirke, Governor (1681–1683)
George Legge, Governor (1683–1684)

North America

Albemarle Settlements
Governors
William Drummond, Governor (1664–1667)
Samuel Stephens, Governor (1667–1669)
Peter Carteret, Governor (1670–1672)
John Jenkins, Governor (1672–1675)
Thomas Eastchurch, Governor (1675–1676)
John Jenkins, Governor (1676–1677)
Thomas Miller, Governor (1677–1677)
John Harvey, Governor (1679–1679)
John Jenkins, Governor (1680–1681)
Seth Sothel, Governor (1682–1689)

Avalon Peninsula, Newfoundland
Governors
John Guy, Proprietary governor of Cuper's Cove (1610–1614)
John Mason, Proprietary governor of Cuper's Cove (1615–1621)
Robert Hayman, Proprietary governor of Bristol's Hope (1618–1628)
Richard Whitbourne, Proprietary governor of Renews (1618–1620)
Francis Tanfield, Proprietary governor of South Falkland (1623–1626)
Edward Wynne, Proprietary governor of Ferryland (1621–1625)
Arthur Aston, Proprietary governor of Avalon (1625–1627)
George Calvert, Proprietary governor of Avalon (1627–1629)
Cecilius Calvert, de facto Proprietary governor (1629–1632)
William Hill, Proprietary governor of Avalon  (1634–1638)
David Kirke, Proprietary governor of Newfoundland (1638–1651)
John Treworgie, Proprietary governor of Newfoundland (1653–1660)

Province of Carolina
Governors
Philip Ludwell, Governor (1689–1693)
Thomas Smith, Governor (1693–1694)
Joseph Blake, Governor (1694)
John Archdale, Governor (1695–1696)
Joseph Blake, Governor (1696–1700)
James Moore, Governor (1700–1703)
Deputy governors, for the northern Carolina
John Gibbs, Deputy governor (1689–1690)
Thomas Jarvis, Deputy governor (1690–1694)
Thomas Harvey, Deputy governor (1694–1699)
Henderson Walker, Deputy governor (1699–1703)

Charles Town
Governors
William Sayle, Governor (1670–1671)
Joseph West, Governor (1671–1672)
John Yeamans, Governor (1672–1674)
Joseph West, Governor (1674–1682)
Joseph Morton, Governor (1682–1684)
Richard Kyrle, Governor (1684)
Joseph West, Governor (1684–1685)
Robert Quary, Governor (1685)
Joseph Morton, Governor (1685–1686)
James Colleton, Governor (1686–1690)
Seth Sothell, Governor (1690–1692)

Connecticut Colony
Governors
John Haynes, Governor (1639–1640)
Edward Hopkins, Governor (1640–1641)
John Haynes, Governor (1641–1642)
George Wyllys, Governor (1642–1643)
John Haynes, Governor (1643–1644)
Edward Hopkins, Governor (1644–1645)
John Haynes, Governor (1645–1646)
Edward Hopkins, Governor (1646–1647)
John Haynes, Governor (1647–1648)
Edward Hopkins, Governor (1649–1650)
John Haynes, Governor (1650–1651)
Edward Hopkins, Governor (1651–1652)
John Haynes, Governor (1652–1653)
Edward Hopkins, Governor (1653–1654)
John Haynes, Governor (1654–1655)
Edward Hopkins, Governor (1655–1656)
Thomas Welles, Governor (1655–1656)
John Webster, Governor (1656–1657)
John Winthrop the Younger, Governor (1657–1658)
Thomas Welles, Governor (1658–1659)
John Winthrop the Younger, Governor (1659–1676)
William Leete, Governor (1676–1683)
Robert Treat, Governor (1683–1687)
Edmund Andros, Governor (1687–1689
Robert Treat, Governor (1689–1698)
Fitz-John Winthrop, Governor (1698–1707)

Province of Maryland
Governors 
William Stone, Governor (1634–1647)
Benjamin Tasker, Sr., Governor (1647–1649)
Leonard Calvert, Governor (1649–1656)
Josias Fendall, Governor (1657–1660)
Thomas Lawrence, Governor (1660)
Charles Calvert, 3rd Baron Baltimore, Governor (1661–1676)
John Coode, Governor (1676)
Thomas Notley, Governor (1676–1679)
Charles Calvert, 3rd Baron Baltimore, Governor (1679–1684)
Benedict Calvert, Governor (1684–1688)
Benedict Leonard Calvert, Governor (1688–1689)
John Hart, Governor (1689–1690)
Nehemiah Blakiston, Governor (1691–1692)
Thomas Greene, Governor (1692–1693)
Lionel Copley, Governor (1693–1694)
Edward Lloyd, Governor (1693)
Nicholas Greenberry, Governor (1693–1694)
Edmund Andros, Governor (1694)
Edmund Andros, Governor (1694)
Francis Nicholson, Governor (1694–1699)
Nathaniel Blakiston, Governor (1699–1702)

Massachusetts Bay Colony
Governors
Matthew Cradock, Governor (1628–1629)
John Endecott, Governor (1629–1630)
John Winthrop, Governor (1629–1634)
Thomas Dudley, Governor (1630–1634)
Thomas Dudley, Governor (1634–1635)
John Haynes, Governor (1635–1636)
Henry Vane the Younger, Governor (1636–1637)
John Winthrop, Governor (1637–1640)
Thomas Dudley, Governor (1640–1641)
Richard Bellingham, Governor (1641–1642)
John Winthrop, Governor (1642–1644)
John Endecott, Governor (1644–1645)
Thomas Dudley, Governor (1645–1646)
John Winthrop, Governor (1646–1649)
John Endecott, Governor (1649–1650)
Thomas Dudley, Governor (1650–1651)
John Endecott, Governor (1651–1654)
Richard Bellingham, Governor (1654–1655)
John Endecott, Governor (1655–1665)
Richard Bellingham, Governor (1665–1672)
John Leverett, Governor (1671–72)
John Leverett, Acting Governor (1672–1673), Governor (1673–1679)
Simon Bradstreet, Governor (1678–1679)
Simon Bradstreet, Governor (1679–1686)
Dominion of New England (1686–1689)Moore, p. 385
Simon Bradstreet, Governor (1689–1692)Moore, p. 226

Province of Massachusetts Bay
Governors
William Phips, Governor (1692–1694)
William Stoughton, Acting Governor (1694–1699)
Richard Coote, 1st Earl of Bellomont, Governor (1699–1700)
William Stoughton, Acting Governor (1700–1701)

New Albion
Governors
Edmund Plowden, Governor and Captain general (1634–1649)

Province of New Hampshire
Governors 
Walter Neale, Governor (1630–1633)Belknap, pp. 1:21,25–26
Francis Norton, Governor (1634?–1641)Tuttle (1887), p. 89
Henry Josselyn, Governor (1634–1638)
Francis Norton, Governor (1638–1640?)
Thomas Wiggin, Governor (1633?–1637)
George Burdett, Governor (1637–1641)Massachusetts Bay Colony (1641–1680)
John Cutt, President (1680–1681)
Richard Waldron, President (1681–1682)
Edward Cranfield, Administrator (1682–1685)
Walter Barefoote, Acting Governor (1685–1686)Dominion of New England (1686–1689)
Samuel Allen, Governor (1691/2–1699)
Richard Coote, 1st Earl of Bellomont, Governor (1697–1701/2)

New England
Governors
Robert Gorges, Governor general (1623–1624)

Dominion of New England
Governors
Joseph Dudley, President of the Council (1686)
Edmund Andros, Governor (1686–1689)

New Haven Colony
Governors
Theophilus Eaton, Governor (1639–1658)
Francis Newman, Governor (1658–1660)
William Leete, Governor (1661–1665)

East Jersey
Governors
Andrew Hamilton, Governor (1692–1697)
Jeremiah Basse, Governor (1698–1699)
Andrew Hamilton, Governor (1699–1702)

West Jersey
Governors
Andrew Hamilton, Governor (1692–1697)
Jeremiah Basse, Governor (1698–1699)
Andrew Bowne, Governor (1699)
Andrew Hamilton, Governor (1699–1702)

Province of New York
Governors 
Benjamin Fletcher, Governor (1692–1697)
Richard Coote, Governor (1698–1701)

Plymouth Colony
Governors
John Carver, Governor (1620–1621)
William Bradford, Governor (1621–1633)
Edward Winslow, Governor (1633–1634)
Thomas Prence, Governor (1634–1635)
William Bradford, Governor (1635–1636)
Edward Winslow, Governor (1636–1637)
William Bradford, Governor (1637–1638)
Thomas Prence, Governor (1638–1639)
William Bradford, Governor (1639–1644)
Edward Winslow, Governor (1644–1645)
William Bradford, Governor (1645–1657)
Thomas Prence, Governor (1657–1673)
Josiah Winslow, Governor (1673–1680)
Thomas Hinckley, Governor (1680–1686)
William Bradford the Younger, Governor (1682–1686)
Dominion of New England (1686–1689)
Thomas Hinckley, Governor (1689–1692)

Popham Colony
Governors
George Popham, Governor (1607)
Ralegh Gilbert, Governor (1608)

Colony of Rhode Island and Providence Plantations
Magistrates 
William Coddington, Judge of Portsmouth (1638–1639)
William Hutchinson, Judge of Portsmouth (1639–1640)
William Coddington, Judge of Newport (1639–1640)
William Rosales, Governor of Portsmouth and Newport (1640–1647)
Roger Williams, Chief officer (1644–1647)
John Coggeshall, President (1647)
Jeremy Clarke, President (1648–1649)
John Smith, President (1649–1650)
Nicholas Easton, President (1650–1651)
Samuel Gorton, President, Providence and Warwick only (1651–1652)
John Smith, President, Providence and Warwick only (1652–1653)
Gregory Dexter, President, Providence and Warwick only (1653–1654)
Nicholas Easton, President (1654–1654)
Roger Williams, President (1654–1657)
Benedict Arnold, President (1657–1660)
William Brenton, President (1660–1662)
Benedict Arnold, President (1662–1663)
William Coddington, Governor (1651–1653)
John Sanford, Governor (1653–1653)
Benedict Arnold, Governor (1663–1666)
William Brenton, Governor (1666–1669)
Benedict Arnold, Governor (1669–1672)
Nicholas Easton, Governor (1672–1674)
William Coddington, Governor (1674–1676)
Walter Clarke, Governor (1676–1677)
Benedict Arnold, Governor (1677–1678)
William Coddington, Governor (1678)
John Cranston, Governor (1678–1680)
Peleg Sanford, Governor (1680–1683)
William Coddington, Jr., Governor (1683–1685)
Henry Bull, Governor (1685–1686)
Walter Clarke, Governor (1686)Dominion of New England (1686–1689)
Henry Bull, Governor (1690–1690)
John Easton, Governor (1690–1695)
Caleb Carr, Governor (1695–1695)
Walter Clarke, Governor (1696–1698)
Samuel Cranston, Governor (1698–1727)

Saybrook Colony
Governors
John Winthrop the Younger, Governor (1635–1639)
George Fenwick, Governor (1639–1644)

Colony of Virginia
Governors
Edward Maria Wingfield, President of the Council (1607)
John Ratcliffe, President of the Council (1608)
Matthew Scrivener, Governor (1608)
John Smith, President of the Council (1608–1609)
The Honourable George Percy, President of the Council (1609–1610)
Thomas West, Governor (1609–1618)
Thomas Gates, Deputy Governor (1610)
The Honourable George Percy, Deputy Governor (1611)
Thomas Dale, Acting Governor (May–August 1611)
Thomas Gates, Acting Governor (1611–1613)
Thomas Dale, Acting Governor (1613–1616)
George Yeardley, Lieutenant Governor (1616–1617)
Samuel Argall, Lieutenant Governor (1617–1619)
George Yeardley, Governor (1619–1621)
Francis Wyatt, Governor (1621–1624)
Francis Wyatt, Governor (1624–1626)
George Yeardley, Governor (1626–1627)
Francis West, Acting Governor (1627–1629)
John Harvey, Governor (1628–1639)
John Pott, Acting Governor (1629–1630)
John West, Acting Governor (1635–1636)
George Reade, Acting Governor (1638–1639)
Francis Wyatt, Governor (1639–1642)
William Berkeley, Governor (1642–1652)
Richard Kemp, Acting Governor (1644–1645)
Richard Bennett, Governor (1652–1655)
Edward Digges, Governor (1655–1656)
Samuel Mathews, Governor (1656–1660)
William Berkeley, Governor (1660–1677)
Francis Moryson, Lieutenant Governor (1661–1662)
Herbert Jeffries, Governor (1677–1678)
Thomas Culpeper, Governor (1677–1683)
Henry Chicheley, Lieutenant Governor (1678–1680)
Nicholas Spencer, Acting Governor (1683–1684)
Francis Howard, Governor (1684–1692)
Joseph Bridger, Governor (1684)
Nathaniel Bacon, President of the Council (1688–1690)
Francis Nicholson, Lieutenant Governor (1690–1692)
Edmund Andros, Governor (1692–1698)
George Hamilton, Governor (1698–1737)
Francis Nicholson, Lieutenant Governor (1698–1705)

Wessagusset Colony
Governors
Richard Greene, Governor (1622)
John Sanders, Governor (1622)

Oceania

Bermuda
Governors
Richard Moore, Governor (1612–1616)
Daniel Tucker, Governor (1616–1619)
Nathaniel Butler, Governor (1619–1622)
John Bernard, Governor (1622)
John Harrison, Governor (1622–1623)
Henry Woodhouse, Governor (1623–1626)
Philip Bell, Governor (1626–1629)
Roger Wood, Governor (1629–1637)
Thomas Chaddock, Governor (1637–1641)
William Sayle, Governor (1641–1642)
Josias Forster, Governor (1642–1643)
William Sayle, Governor (1643–1645)
Josias Forster, Governor (1645)
Triumvirate, Governor (1645–1647)
Thomas Turner, Governor (1647–1649)
John Trimingham, Governor (1649–1650)
Josias Forster, Governor (1650–1659)
William Sayle, Governor (1659–1663)
Florentius Seymour, Governor (1663–1668)
Samuel Whalley, Governor (1668–1669)
John Heydon, Governor (1669–1681)
Florentius Seymour, Governor (1681–1682)
Henry Durham, Acting Governor (1682–1683)
Richard Coney, Governor (1683–1687)
Richard Robinson, Governor (1687–1690)
Isaac Richier, Governor (1691–1693)
John Goddard, Governor (1693–1698)
Samuel Day, Governor (1698–1700)

France
Ancien Régime of France French colonial empireHeads of statePrime ministersCaribbeanFrench Grenada

Governors
Jean Le Comte, Governor (1649–1654)
Louis Cacqueray de Valminière, Governor (1654–1658)
Dubuc, Governor (1658)
Jean Faudoas de Cérillac, Governor (1658–1664)
Vincent, Governor (1664–1670)
Louis de Canchy de Lerole, Governor (1671–1674)
Pierre de Sainte-Marthe de Lalande, Governor (1675–1679)
Jacques de Chambly, Governor (1679–1680)
Nicholas de Gabaret, Governor (1680–1689)
Louis Ancelin de Gemostat, Governor (1690–1695)
Jean-Léon Fournier de Carles de Pradine, Governor (1695?–1696?)
De Bellair de Saint-Aignan, Governor (1696–1700)North AmericaNew France
Lieutenant generals
Marquis de la Roche-Mesgouez, Lieutenant general (1598–1603)Harrisse, Henry (1872) Notes pour servir à l'histoire, à la bibliographie et àla cartographie de la Nouvelle-France et des pays adjacents, 1545–1700. Tross, Paris, p. 14;
Pierre Dugua, Sieur de Monts, Lieutenant general (1603–1610)
Charles de Bourbon, comte de Soissons, Lieutenant general (1611–1612)
Henry II, Prince of Condé, Lieutenant general (1612–1616)
Pons de Lauzière, Marquis de Thémines de Cardillac, Lieutenant general (1616–1620)
Henry II, Prince of Condé, Lieutenant general (1620)
Henri II de Montmorency, Lieutenant general (1620–1625)
Henri de Lévis, duc de Ventadour, Lieutenant general (1625–1626)
Cardinal Richelieu, Lieutenant general (1626–1627), Governor (1627–1632)
Governors (See also) 
Cardinal Richelieu, Lieutenant general (1626–1627), Governor (1627–1632)
Samuel de Champlain, Governor (1632–1635)
Charles de Montmagny, Governor (1635–1648)
Louis d'Ailleboust de Coulonge, Governor (1648–1651)
Jean de Lauson, Governor (1651–1657)
Pierre de Voyer d'Argenson, Vicomte de Mouzay, Governor (1657–1661)
Pierre Dubois Davaugour, Governor (1661–1663)
Governors general (See also) 
Augustin de Saffray de Mésy, Governor general (1663–1665)
Daniel de Rémy de Courcelle, Governor general (1665–1672)
Louis de Buade de Frontenac, Governor general (1672–1682)
Antoine Lefèbvre de La Barre, Governor general (1682–1685)
Jacques-René de Brisay de Denonville, Marquis de Denonville, Governor general (1685–1689)
Louis de Buade de Frontenac, Governor general (1689–1698)
Louis-Hector de Callière, Governor general (1698–1703)

Placentia, Newfoundland
Governors
Sieur de Kéréon, Governor (1655–1660)
Nicolas Gargot de la Rochette, Governor (1660–1662)
Thalour Du Perron, Governor (1662–1663)
Lafontaine Bellot, Governor (1664–1667)
Sieur de la Palme, Governor (1667–1670)
Sieur de la Poippe, Governor (1670–1684)
Antoine Parat, Governor (1685–1690)
Louis de Pastour de Costebelle, Governor (1690–1691)
Jacques-François de Monbeton de Brouillan, Governor (1690–1701)
Joseph de Monic, Governor (1697–1702)

Netherlands
Dutch Republic Dutch colonial empireMonarchsAfricaDutch Loango-Angola
Governors
Pieter Moorthamer, Director (1641–1642)
Cornelis Hendrikszoon Ouman, Director (1642–1648)AsiaDutch East Indies
Governors general
Pieter Both, Governors general (1610–1614)
Gerard Reynst, Governors general (1614–1615)
Laurens Reael, Governors general (1615–1619)
Jan Pieterszoon Coen, Governors general (1619–1623)
Pieter de Carpentier, Governors general (1623–1627)
Jan Pieterszoon Coen, Governors general (1627–1629)
Jacques Specx, Governors general (1629–1632)
Hendrik Brouwer, Governors general (1632–1636)
Anthony van Diemen, Governors general (1636–1645)
Cornelis van der Lijn, Governors general (1645–1650)
Carel Reyniersz, Governors general (1650–1653)
Joan Maetsuycker, Governors general (1653–1678)
Rijckloff van Goens, Governors general (1678–1681)
Cornelis Speelman, Governors general (1681–1684)
Johannes Camphuys, Governors general (1684–1691)
Willem van Outhoorn, Governors general (1691–1704)

Dutch Formosa
Governors
Martinus Sonck, Governor (1624–1625)
Gerard Frederikszoon de With, Governor (1625–1627)
Pieter Nuyts, Governor (1627–1629)
Hans Putmans, Governor (1629–1636)
Johan van der Burg, Governor (1636–1640)
Paulus Traudenius, Governor (1640–1643)
Maximilian le Maire, Governor (1643–1644)
François Caron, Governor (1644–1646)
Pieter Anthoniszoon Overtwater, Governor (1646–1650)
Nicolas Verburg, Governor (1650–1653)
Cornelis Caesar, Governor (1653–1656)
Frederick Coyett, Governor (1656–1662)North AmericaNew Netherland
Directors
Cornelius Jacobsen May, Director general (1624–1625)
Willem Verhulst, Director general (1625–1626)
Peter Minuit, Director (1626–1632)
Sebastiaen Jansen Krol, Director general (1632–1633)
Wouter Van Twiller, Director general (1633–1638)
Willem Kieft, Director general (1638–1647)
Peter Stuyvesant, Director general (1647–1664)
Anthony Colve, Director general (1673–1674)South AmericaDutch Brazil
John Maurice of Nassau, Governor (1637–1643)

Oman
Yaruba dynasty of OmanMonarchsMombasa
Walis
Imam Sa‘if ibn Sultan, Wali (1698)
Nasr ibn Abdallah al-Mazru‘i, Wali (1698–1728)

Portugal
Kingdom of Portugal Portuguese colonial empireMonarchsAfrica

Portuguese Angola
Governors
João Furtado de Mendonça, Governor (1594–1602)
João Rodrigues Coutinho, Governor (1602–1603)
Manuel Cerveira Pereira, Governor (1603–1606)
unknown governor (1606–1607)
Manuel Pereira Forjaz, Governor (1607–1611)
Bentro Banha Cardoso, Governor (1611–1615)
Manuel Cerveira Pereira, Governor (1615–1617)
Luís Mendes de Vasconcelos, Governor (1617–1621)
João Correia de Sousa, Governor (1621–1623)
Pedro de Sousa Coelho, Governor (1623)
Simão de Mascarenhas, Governor (1623–1624)
Fernão de Sousa, Governor (1624–1630)
Manuel Pereira Coutinho, Governor (1630–1635)
Francisco de Vasconcelos, Governor (1635–1639)
Pedro César de Meneses, Governor (1639–1645)
Francisco de Souto-Maior, Governor (1645–1646)
Triumvirate junta (1646–1648)
Salvador Correia de Sá, Governor (1648–1651)
Salvador Correia de Sá, Governor (1648–1651)
Rodrigo de Miranda Henriques, Governor (1652–1653)
Bartolomeu de Vasconcelos, Governor (1653–1654)
Luís Mendes de Sousa, Governor (1654–1658)
João Fernandes Vieira, Governor (1658–1661)
André Vidal de Negreiros, Governor (1661–1666)
Tristão da Cunha, Governor (1666–1667)
Junta rule (1667–1669)
Francisco de Távora, Governor (1669–1676)
Pires de Saldanha, Governor (1676–1680)
João da Silva e Sousa, Governor (1680–1684)
Luís Lobo da Silva, Governor (1684–1688)
João de Lencastre, Governor (1688–1691)
Gonçalo da Costa, Governor (1691–1694)
Henrique Jacques de Magalhães, Governor (1694–1697)
Luís César de Meneses, Governor (1697–1701)

Portuguese Cape Verde
Governors
Fancisco Lobo da Gama, Governor (1597–1603)
Fernão de Mesquita de Brito, Governor (1603–1606)
Francisco Correia da Silva, Governor (1606–1611)
Francisco Martins de Sequeira, Governor (1611–1614)
Nicolau de Castilho, Governor (1614–1618)
Francisco de Moura, Governor (1618–1622)
Francisco Roulim, Governor (1622–1622)
Manuel Afonso de Guerra, Acting Governor (1622–1624)
Francisco Vasconcelos da Cunha, Governor (1624–1628)
João Pereira Corte-Real, Governor (1628–1632)
Cristóvão de Cabral, Governor (1632–1636)
Jorge de Castilho, Governor (1636–1639)
Jerónimo de Cavalcanti e Albuquerque, Governor (1639–1640)
João Serrão da Cunha, Governor (1640–1645)
Lourenço Garro, Governor (1645–1646)
Jorge de Araújo, Governor (1646–1648)
Roque de Barros do Rêgo, Governor (1648–1648)
 Council of Government (1648–1649)
Gonçalo de Gamboa Ayala, Governor (1649–1650)
Pedro Semedo Cardoso, Governor (1650–1651)
Jorge de Mesquita Castelo Branco, Governor (1651–1653)
Pedro Ferreira Barreto, Governor (1563–1658)
Francisco de Figueroa, Governor (1558–1663)
António Galvão, Governor (1663–1667)
Manuel da Costa Pessoa, Governor (1667–1671)
Manuel Pacheco de Melo, Governor (1671–1676)
João Cardoso Pássaro, Governor (1676–1676)
 Council of Government (1676–1678)
Manuel da Costa Pessoa, Governor (11678–1683)
Inácio de Franca Barbosa, Governor (1681–1687)
Veríssimo Carvalho da Costa, Governor (1687–1688)
Vitoriano da Costa, Governor (1688–1690)
Digo Ramires Esquível, Governor (1690–1691)
 Council of Government (1691–1692)
Manuel António Pinheiro da Câmara, Governor (1692–1696)
António Gomes Mena, Governor (1696–1696)
 Council of Government (1696–1698)
António Salgado, Governor (1698–1702)

Mombasa
Captains major
Dau, príncipe de Faza, Captain major (1697–1698)
Leonardo Barbosa Souto-Maior, Captain major (1698)

Portuguese Moçambique
Captains general, Governors
Álvaro Abranches, Captain general (1598–1601)
Vasco de Mascarenhas, Captain general (1601–1604)
Sebastião de Macedo, Captain general (1604–1607)
Estêvão de Ataíde, Captain general (1607–1609)
Colony of Moçambique, Sofala, Ríos de Cuama, and Monomatapa under Goa
Nuno Álvares Pereira, Governor (1609–1611)
Estévão de Ataíde, Governor (1611–1612)
Diogo Simões de Madeira, Acting Governor (1612)
João de Azevedo, Governor (1612–1614)
Rui de Melo Sampaio, Governor (1614–1618)
Nuno Álvares Pereira, Governor (1618–1623)
Lopo de Almeida, Governor (1623–1624)
Diogo de Sousa de Meneses, Governor (1624–1627)
Nuno Álvares Pereira, Governor (1627–1631)
Cristóvão de Brito e Vasconcelos, Acting Governor (1631–1632)
Diogo de Sousa de Meneses, Governor (1632–1633)
Filipe de Mascarenhas, Governor (1633–1634)
Lourenço de Souto-Maior, Governor (1634–1639)
Diogo de Vasconcelos, Governor (1639–1640)
António de Brito Pacheco, Governor (1640–1641)
Francisco da Silveira, Governor (1641–1642)
Júlio Moniz da Silva, Governor (1642–1646)
Fernão Dias Baião, Governor (1646–1648)
Álvaro de Sousa de Távora, Governor (1648–1651)
Francisco de Mascarenhas, Governor (1651–1652)
Francisco de Lima, Governor (1652–1657)
Manuel Corte-Real de Sampaio, Governor (1657–1661)
Manuel de Mascarenhas, Governor (1661–1664)
António de Melo e Castro, Governor (1664–1667)
Inácio Sarmento de Carvalho, Governor (1667–1670)
João de Sousa Freire, Governor (1670–1673)
Simão Gomes da Silva, Governor (1673–1674)
André Pinto da Fonseca, Governor (1674)
Manuel da Silva, Acting Governor (1674–1676)
João de Sousa Freire, Governor (1676–1682)
Caetano de Melo e Castro, Governor (1682–1686)
Miguel de Almeida, Governor (1686–1689)
Manuel dos Santos Pinto, Governor (1689–1692)
Tomé de Sousa Correia, Governor (1692–1693)
Francisco Correia de Mesquita, Acting Governor (1693–1694)
Estêvão José da Costa, Governor (1694–1695)
Francisco da Costa, Governor (1695–1696)
Luís de Melo Sampaio, Governor (1696–1699)
Jácome de Morais Sarmento, Governor (1699–1703)

Portuguese São Tomé
Governors
João Barbosa da Cunha, Acting Governor (c.1598–1601)
António Maciel Monteiro, Acting Governor (1601–1604)
Pedro de Andrade, Governor (1604–?)
João Barbosa da Cunha, Acting Governor (?–1609)
Fernando de Noronha, Governor (1609)
Constantino Tavares, Governor (1609–1611)
João Barbosa da Cunha, Acting Governor (1611)
Francisco Teles de Meneses, Governor (1611)
Luís Dias de Abreu, Governor (1611–1613)
Feliciano Carvalho, Governor (1613–1614)
Luís Dias de Abreu, Governor (1614–1616)
Miguel Correia Baharem, Governor (1616–1620)
Pedro da Cunha, Governor (1620–1621)
Félix Pereira, Governor (1621–1623)
Jerónimo de Melo Fernando, Governor (1623–1627)
André Gonçalves Maracote, Governor (1627–1628)
Lourenço Pires de Távora, Acting Governor (1628–1632)
Francisco Barreto de Meneses, Governor (1632)
Lourenço Pires de Távora, Acting Governor (1632–1636)
António de Carvalho, Governor (1636)
Lourenço Pires de Távora, Acting Governor (1636–1640)
Manuel Quaresma Carneiro, Governor (1640)
Miguel Pereira de Melo e Albuquerque, Acting Governor (1640–1641)
unspecified Dutch commander (1641–1648)
Paulo da Ponte, Acting Governor (1641–1642)
Lourenço Pires de Távora, Governor (1642–c.1650)
unspecified (c.1650–1656)
Cristóvão de Barros do Rêgo, Governor (1656–c.1657)
unspecified (c.1657–c.1661)
Pedro da Silva, Governor (c.1661–166.)
unspecified (166.–1669)
Paulo Ferreira de Noronha, Governor (1669–1671)
Chamber Senate (1671–1673)
Julião de Campos Barreto, Governor (1673–1677)
Bernardim Freire de Andrade, Governor (1677–1680)
Jacinto de Figueiredo e Abreu, Governor (1680–1683)
João Álvares da Cunha, Acting Governor (1683–1686)
António Pereira de Brito Lemos, Governor (1686)
Bento de Sousa Lima, Governor (1686–1689)
António Pereira de Lacerda, Governor (1689–1693)
António de Barredo, Governor (1693–1694)
José Pereira Sodré, Governor (1695–1696)
João da Costa Matos, Governor (1696–1697)
Manuel António Pinheiro da Câmara, Governor (1697–1702)

Portuguese Tangier
Governors
António Pereira Lopes de Berredo, Governor (1599–1605)
Nunho de Mendonça, Governor (1605–1610)
Afonso de Noronha, Governor (1610–1614)
Luís de Meneses, Governor (1614)
Luís de Noronha, Governor (1614–1615)
João Coutinho, Governor (1615–1616)
André Dias da França, Governor (1616–1617)
Pedro Manuel, Governor (1617–1621)
André Dias da França, Governor (1621–1622)
Jorge de Mascarenhas, Governor (1622–1624)
Miguel de Noronha, Governor (1624–1628)
Galaaz Fernandes da Silveira, Governor (1628)
Fernando de Mascarenhas, Governor (1628–1637)
Rodrigo Lobo da Silveira, Governor (1637–1643)
André Dias da França, Governor (1643–1645)
Caetano Coutinho, Governor (1645–1649)
Luís Lobo, Governor (1649–1653)
Rodrigo de Lencastre, Governor (1653–1656)
Fernando de Meneses, 2nd Count of Ericeira, Governor (1656–1661)
Luís de Almeida, Governor (1661–1662)

Asia

Portuguese Macau
Governors
Manuel da Camara de Noronha, Governor (1631–1636)
Diogo de Melo de Castro, Governor (1636–1638)

South America

Colonial Brazil
Governors general
D. Francisco de Sousa, Governor general (1591–1602)
Diogo Botelho, Governor general (1603–1607)
Lourenço da Veiga, Governor general (1607–1613, Bahia)
Afonso de Albuquerque, Governor general (1608–1613, Rio de Janeiro)
Diogo de Meneses, Governor general (1608–1612)
Gaspar de Sousa, Governor general (1612–1617)
Luís de Sousa, Governor general (1617–1621)

Spain
Habsburg Spain Spanish colonial empire
Monarchs

Caribbean

Captaincy General of Cuba
Francisco Riaño y Gamboa, Governor of Cuba (1634–1639)

Colony of Santiago
Governors
Fernando Melgarejo Córdoba, Governor (1596–1606)
Alonso de Miranda, Governor (1607–1611)
Pedro Espejo Barranco, Governor (1611–1614)
Andrés González de Vera, Governor (1614–?)
Sebastián Lorenzo Romano, Governor (1620?)
Francisco Terril, Governor (1625–1632)
Juan Martínez Arana, Governor (1632–1637)
Gabriel Peñalver Angulo, Governor (1637–1639)
Jacinto Sedeño Albornoz, Governor (1639–1640)
Francisco Ladrón de Zegama, Governor (1640–1643)
Alcades, Governor (1643–1645)
Sebastián Fernández de Gamboa, Governor (1645–1646)
Pedro Caballero, Governor (1646–1650)
Jacinto Sedeño Albornoz, Governor (1650)
Francisco de Proenza, Governor (1650–1651)
Juan Ramírez de Arellano, Governor (1651–1655)
Francisco de Proenza, Governor (1655–1656)
Cristóbal Arnaldo Isasi, Governor (1656–1660)

Europe

Naples
Manuel de Acevedo y Zúñiga, Viceroy of Naples (1631–1637)

Spanish Netherlands
Governors
Isabella Clara Eugenia of Austria, Governor (1621–1633)
Ferdinand of Austria, Governor (1633–1641)
Francisco de Melo, Governor (1641–1644)
Manuel de Moura, Governor (1644–1647)
Leopold William of Austria, Governor (1647–1656)
John of Austria the Younger, Governor (1656–1659)
Luis de Benavides Carrillo, Governor (1659–1664)
Francisco de Moura, Governor (1664–1668)
Íñigo Melchor de Velasco, Governor (1668–1670)
Juan Domingo de Zuñiga y Fonseca, Governor (1670–1675)
Carlos de Aragón de Gurrea, Governor (1675–1677)
Alexander Farnese, Governor (1678–1682)
Ottone Enrico del Caretto, Governor (1682–1685)
Francisco Antonio de Agurto, Governor (1685–1692)
Maximilian II Emanuel of Bavaria, Governor (1692–1706)

Viceroyalty of Sardinia
Antonio de Urrea, Viceroy (1632–1637)

North America

Florida
Laureano José de Torres Ayala a Duadros Castellanos, Governor of Florida (1693–1699)

Panama
Enrique Enríquez de Sotomayor, Royal Governor (1634–1638)

New Mexico
Diego de Vargas, Governor of New Mexico (1688–1696)

New Spain / Viceroyalty of New Spain
Viceroys (complete list) —
Gaspar de Zúñiga, (1595–1603)
Juan de Mendoza, (1603—1607)
Luis de Velasco, (1590—1595, 1607—1611)
Fray Francisco García Guerra, archbishop (1611—1612)
Diego Fernández de Córdoba, (1612—1621)
Rodrigo Pacheco, (1624—1635)
Lope Díez de Armendáriz, (1635—1640)
Diego López Pacheco, (1640—1642)
Juan de Palafox y Mendoza, bishop and interim archbishop (1642)
García Sarmiento de Sotomayor, (1642—1648)
Marcos de Torres y Rueda, bishop (1648—1649)
Luis Enríquez de Guzmán, (1650—1653)
Francisco Fernández de la Cueva, (1653—1660)
Juan Francisco Leiva y de la Cerda, (1660—1664)
Diego Osorio de Escobar y Llamas, bishop (1664)
Antonio Sebastián Álvarez de Toledo, (1664—1673)
Pedro Nuño Colón de Portugal, (1673)
Payo Enríquez de Rivera, archbishop (1673—1680)
Tomás de la Cerda, (1680—1686)
Melchor Portocarrero, (1686—1688)
Gaspar de la Cerda, (1688—1696)
Juan Ortega y Montañés, archbishop (1696, 1701—1702)
José Sarmiento de Valladares, (1696—1701)

South America

Captaincy General of Chile
Juan de la Jaraquemada, Royal Governor of Chile (1611–1612)
Francisco Laso de la Vega, Governor (1629–1639)
Tomás Marín de Poveda, 1st Marquis of Cañada Hermosa, Governor (1692–1700)

Viceroyalty of Peru
Viceroys
Luis Jerónimo de Cabrera, Viceroy (1629–1639)
Melchor Portocarrero, 3rd Count of Monclova, Viceroy (1689–1705)

Sweden
Sweden Swedish coloniesMonarchs''

New Sweden
List of colonial governors of New Jersey#Governors of New Sweden (1638–55)

Notes

References

External links
WorldStatesmen—an online encyclopedia of the leaders of nations and territories

Territorial governors
-17th century
Territorial governors
 Territorial governors